Mexico made its Paralympic Games début at the 1972 Summer Paralympics in Heidelberg, with a delegation of seven athletes competing in track and field, swimming, weightlifting and wheelchair fencing. It has competed in every edition of the Summer Paralympics since then, and made its Winter Paralympics début in 2006.

Mexicans have won a total of 311 Paralympic medals, of which 104 are gold, 92 silver and 115 bronze, placing them 25th on the all-time Paralympic Games medal table. Although Mexicans did not win any medals at the 1972 Games, they swept up sixteen gold (fifteen in athletics, one in swimming) in 1976, along with fourteen silver and nine bronze, and continued to win medals during every subsequent edition of the Summer Games.

Among the most successful Mexican Paralympians, Josefina Cornejo won four gold medals in track and field at the 1976 Games, reiterating that result four years later. Runner Juana Soto also took four gold in 1980, as did Leticia Torres in 1988.

Mexican delegations to the Winter Games, by contrast, have been small (one competitor in 2006, two in 2010, one in 2014 and one in 2018), and have not won any medals.

Medals

Medals by Summer Games

Medals by Winter Games

Medals by Summer sport

Medals by Winter Sport

See also
 Mexico at the Olympics

References